

The Aichi AC-1 was an experimental  nine-cylinder air-cooled radial engine. In 1929, it was used to power the newly designed Aichi AB-2, a catapult-launched reconnaissance seaplane.

The AB-2 with its AC-1 engine is noted for being the first shipboard reconnaissance seaplane and engine combination designed and manufactured entirely in Japan, without foreign assistance. This was a major turning point, not only for Aichi, but for all of the other Japanese aircraft and engine manufacturers, as they no longer need rely on foreign designs.

The engine proved to be a disappointment by not performing as expected. On one test flight, an exhaust fire spread to the airframe and the aircraft was lost, and, soon after, the project ended.

None of these engines survive today, and little is known about them.

Specifications

References

 Mikesh, Robert C.; Abe, Shorzoe (1990). Japanese Aircraft 1910-1941. London: Putnam. 

1920s aircraft piston engines
Aircraft air-cooled radial piston engines